Sosebee is a surname. Notable people with the surname include:

David Sosebee (born 1955), American race car driver, son of Gober
Gober Sosebee (1915–1996), American race car driver

English-language surnames